P. Jean-Baptiste Bradel, a French draughtsman and engraver, was born in Paris about 1750. He was chiefly employed in engraving portraits, which are neatly executed, and which include the following plates:

Pope Benedict XIV.
Pope Clement XIV.
Madame Louise, of France.
Louis François Gabriel de la Motte, Bishop of Amiens.
General Paoli.
Prosper Jean de Crébillon.
Jean Bart, Admiral.
The Chevalier d'Eon.
An allegorical subject; inscribed Trinus et unus.
A Boy playing on the Tambour de Basque.

References
 

French draughtsmen
Engravers from Paris
18th-century French engravers
Year of birth unknown
Year of death unknown